Şahbuz is a city and municipality in and capital of Shahbuz District, in the Nakhchivan Autonomous Republic of Azerbaijan. It has a population of 3,127.

References

External links

Populated places in Shahbuz District